Othman Ahmed Othman Al Omairah (also transliterated as Othman Ahmad Othman al-Ghamdi) was a citizen of Saudi Arabia, who was held in extrajudicial detention in the United States Guantanamo Bay detainment camps, in Cuba.

His Guantanamo Internment Serial Number was 184.

Inconsistent identification
Othman was identified differently on official US documents and official Saudi documents.

He was identified as Othman Ahmed Othman Al Omairah on official lists of captives from April 2006, May 2006 and September 2007, and on the memos that summarized the allegations against him.

On June 25, 2006, the USA repatriated 14 men to Saudi Arabia, including a man the Saudi government identified as Othman Ahmad Othman al-Ghamdi.

The DoD reports that he was a citizen of Yemen.

Combatant Status Review 

A Summary of Evidence memo was prepared for his tribunal. The memo listed the following allegations against him:

Administrative Review Board 

Detainees whose Combatant Status Review Tribunal labeled them "enemy combatants" were scheduled for annual Administrative Review Board hearings.  These hearings were designed to assess the threat a detainee might pose if released or transferred, and whether there were other factors that warranted his continued detention.

Summary of Evidence memo

A Summary of Evidence memo was prepared for 
Othman Ahmed Othman Al Omairah
Administrative Review Board, 
on September 20, 2005.
The memo listed factors for and against his continued detention.
His memo was three pages long.

Guantanamo record

There is no record that Othman Ahmad Othman al-Ghamdi chose to attend either his Combatant Status Review Tribunal or his Administrative Review Board hearing.

Transfer to Saudi Arabia

On June 25, 2006, 14 men were transferred from Guantanamo to Saudi Arabia.
A Saudi identified as 
Othman Ahmad Othman al-Ghamdi was identified as one of the released men.

Named on a Saudi "most wanted" list

On February 3, 2009, the Saudi government published a list of 85 "most wanted" suspected terrorists, that included an individual identified as "Othman Al-Ghamdi".
This list contained ten other former Guantanamo captives.
Half of the eleven former captives listed on most wanted list were also from among the eleven men repatriated on November 9, 2007—in spite of their annual reviews recommending continued detention.

The Saudi Gazette reported he "is believed to have traveled to a neighboring country" with his brother-in-law, fellow "most wanted" suspect and fellow former Guantanamo captive, Adnan Al-Sayegh, leaving behind his wife and son.

Reported the death of Fahd Al Jutayli

The Yemen Post reported on September 27 that Othman al-Ghamdi and Yousuf Al-Shahri had 
contacted their families requesting that they pass on news to the family of Fahd Saleh Sulaiman Al-Jatili that he had died during a military action by Yemeni security officials.

Reported to have appeared in a militant video

On May 28, 2010, Thomas Joscelyn, writing in The Long War Journal, reported that former Guantanamo captive "Othman Ahmed al Ghamdi" had recently appeared in a video entitled, "America and the Final Trap".
Joscelyn reported that the tape was released by Al Qaeda in the Arabian Peninsula, and that Othman had confirmed that three of the group's leaders had been killed.  Joscelyn reported that the tape described Othman as one of the group's commanders.

Named on American wanted list

Al-Ghamdi was placed on the U.S. State Department's Rewards for Justice list on October 14, 2014.

Death
Al-Ghamdi was killed in a drone strike in Yemen in February 2015. AQAP confirmed al-Ghamdi's death in September 2018.

References

External links
 The Guantánamo Files: Website Extras (5) – Escape to Pakistan (The Yemenis) Andy Worthington

1979 births
2015 deaths
Detainees of the Guantanamo Bay detention camp
Fugitives
Guantanamo detainees known to have been released
Individuals designated as terrorists by the United States government
Kandahar detention facility detainees
Named on Saudi Arabia's list of most wanted suspected terrorists
Saudi Arabian al-Qaeda members
Saudi Arabian extrajudicial prisoners of the United States